ZERO VFX is a visual effects and creative studio with offices in Boston, Massachusetts  and Venice Beach, California. Co-founded by Brian Drewes and Sean Devereaux in 2010, the company works on feature film and commercial projects.

History

ZERO VFX was founded in 2010 by Brian Drewes and Sean Devereaux.

ZERO VFX developed Zync in 2011, a cloud based rendering tool for VFX and was sold to Google for an undisclosed sum in August 2014.

With headquarters in Boston, the company opened a second office in Venice Beach, California in November 2015.

Sale of Zync

ZERO VFX was the original developer of Zync, a cloud based rendering tool geared towards the visual effects industry with support for The Foundry's NUKE, Autodesk Maya, Solid Angle's Arnold and Chaos Group's V-Ray.  Zync was sold to Google for an undisclosed sum in August 2014.

Previous film projects
Creed 2
Tomb Raider
Fences
Patriots Day
Ghostbusters
The Magnificent Seven
Hardcore Henry
Ridiculous 6
Zookeeper
Project X
Sex Tape
American Hustle
Black Mass
Fury
Southpaw
The Equalizer
The Way, Way Back 
The Interview

Previous advertising projects
Walmart
Ocean Spray
Toyota
SolarCity
Snapchat
Bose Corporation
Under Armour
Vaseline
Jack Daniel's
New Balance
Ocean State Job Lot
US Cellular
Samsonite
Humane Society 
Subway
Friendly's 
1800 Tequila
Dunkin Donuts

References

External links 
ZERO VFX website
Zync website

Visual effects companies
Television and film post-production companies
Mass media companies established in 2010
Companies based in Boston